Bunker Hill is the highest mountain in Lander County, within the Toiyabe Range of central Nevada, United States. It is the twenty-second highest mountain in the state. The peak is located within the Austin Ranger District of the Humboldt-Toiyabe National Forest, about 17 miles south of the small town of Austin and just northwest of the small town of Kingston.

Summit panorama

References

Landforms of Lander County, Nevada
Mountains of Nevada
Humboldt–Toiyabe National Forest